Edward Brownlow Haygarth (26 April 1854 – 14 April 1915) was an English sportsman who represented the England national football team and played first-class cricket with Gloucestershire and Hampshire.

Haygarth was capped just once for England, in a 2–2 draw against Scotland where he played as a full-back. He played his club football at Reading and Swifts.

He also played three first-class cricket matches, appearing once for Hampshire in 1875 and twice as a wicket-keeper with W. G. Grace's Gloucestershire in 1883. His brother John and cousin Arthur both played first-class cricket.

References

External links

Cricinfo: Edward Haygarth

1854 births
1915 deaths
English footballers
England international footballers
Reading F.C. players
Swifts F.C. players
English cricketers
Gloucestershire cricketers
Hampshire cricketers
People from Cirencester
Wanderers F.C. players
Sportspeople from Gloucestershire
Association football fullbacks
Wicket-keepers